Sudbury Catholic District School Board (SCDSB, known as English-language Separate District School Board No. 32 prior to 1999) is a school board in north-central Ontario, Canada. The board is the school district administrator for English language Roman Catholic schools in Greater Sudbury and the southern Sudbury District.

It operates 19 elementary schools, four conventional secondary schools and an adult learning centre.

The Sudbury Catholic District School Board, along with the Basilian Fathers and the Roman Catholic Diocese of Sault Ste. Marie, was responsible for the operation of St. Charles College.  The college was the site of many historical cases of sexual abuse.  A notable case involved the abuse of a teenage boy named Rod McLeod, by Fr. William Hodgson Marshall, who was a teacher and sports educator at the college.  The abuse dates back to the 1960s.

In 2012, four former students filed lawsuits against the SCDSB for the sexual abuse by Father William Hodgson Marshall.

Elementary schools
 Holy Cross Elementary School, South End
 Holy Trinity Elementary School, New Sudbury
 Immaculate Conception Elementary School, Val Caron
 Pius XII Elementary School, Adamsdale
 St. Anne Elementary School, Hanmer
 St. Charles Elementary School, Chelmsford
 St. David Elementary School, Donovan
 St. Francis Elementary School, Gatchell
 St. James Elementary School, Lively
 St. John Elementary School, Garson
 St. Joseph Elementary School, Killarney
 St. Mark Elementary School, Markstay
 St. Paul Elementary School, Coniston

Secondary schools
Bishop Alexander Carter Catholic Secondary School, Hanmer — co-educational 
Marymount Academy, Downtown — all-girls
St. Albert Adult Learning Centre, Downtown — adult high school
St. Benedict Catholic Secondary School, — co-educational
St. Charles College, New Sudbury — co-educational

See also
List of school districts in Ontario
List of high schools in Ontario

References

Roman Catholic school districts in Ontario
Education in Greater Sudbury